John Harms may refer to:

John Harms (Nebraska politician) (born 1940), member of U.S. state legislature
Johnny Harms (1925–2003), professional ice hockey player
 Harms, John Eric (Joe) (1929 - 2014), Australian exploration geologist, minor planet 5167 Joeharms is named after him.